
Gmina Andrzejewo is a rural gmina (administrative district) in Ostrów Mazowiecka County, Masovian Voivodeship, in east-central Poland.

Villages
Gmina Andrzejewo contains the villages and settlements of Andrzejewo, Dąbrowa, Godlewo-Gorzejewo, Gołębie-Leśniewo, Janowo, Jasienica-Parcele, Kowalówka, Króle Duże, Króle Małe, Kuleszki-Nienałty, Łętownica-Parcele, Mianowo, Nowa Ruskołęka, Ołdaki-Polonia, Olszewo-Cechny, Pęchratka Mała, Pieńki Wielkie, Pieńki-Sobótki, Pieńki-Żaki, Przeździecko-Dworaki, Przeździecko-Grzymki, Przeździecko-Jachy, Przeździecko-Lenarty, Ruskołęka-Parcele, Stara Ruskołęka, Załuski-Lipniewo, Zaręby-Bolędy, Zaręby-Choromany, Zaręby-Warchoły and Żelazy-Brokowo.

Neighbouring gminas
Gmina Andrzejewo is bordered by the gminas of Czyżew-Osada, Ostrów Mazowiecka, Szulborze Wielkie, Szumowo, Zambrów and Zaręby Kościelne.

References

Polish official population figures 2006

Andrzejewo
Ostrów Mazowiecka County